Godfred Abban is a Ghanaian professional footballer who plays as midfielder for Ghana Premier League side Medeama S.C. He gained prominence whilst playing for Asokwa Deportivo after scoring the second goal in a 2–1 victory over Kumasi Asante Kotoko in a Ghanaian FA Cup match in February 2020, eliminating Asante Kotoko in the process.

Career

Asokwa Deportivo 
Abban played for lower-tier side Asokwa Deportivo SC before his big move to Ghana Premier League side Medeama SC. On 23 February 2020, he scored a goal in a 2–1 victory over defending Champions Kumasi Asante Kotoko to eliminate them from the Ghanaian FA Cup and qualify for the round of 32.

Medeama SC 
Ahead of the 2020–21 Ghana Premier League season Abban signed for Tarkwa-based side Medeama SC in November 2020. He made his debut on 9 January 2021, coming in the 82nd minute for Agyenim Boateng in a 2–1 victory over Aduana Stars.

References

External links 

Living people
Year of birth missing (living people)
Association football midfielders
Ghanaian footballers
Ghana Premier League players
Medeama SC players